= Khrongkhraeng krop =

Thai dessert

Khrongkhraeng krop (Thai: ครองแครงกรอบ, pronounced [kʰrɔ̄ːŋ.kʰrɛ̄ːŋ krɔ̀ːp]) is traditional Thai dessert that is a dry, crisp favourite. It is made from dough and fried. The main ingredients are wheat flour, eggs, coconut milk, salt, sugar, vegetable oil, garlic, chili, parsley root and pepper. The taste of khrongkhraeng krop is a little spicy from peppers with the scent of garlic with cilantro root.
